Oppido Mamertina is a town and comune of the province of Reggio Calabria in Calabria in southern Italy at about  northeast of Reggio Calabria and about  southwest of Catanzaro.

It is the seat of the Diocese of Oppido Mamertina.

The municipality includes the following boroughs (frazioni): Castellace, Messignadi, Piminoro, and Tresilico.

History
The ancient history of the town is largely unknown, but archeological excavations in Mella might point its origins to the mythical Mamerto (3rd century BC – 1st century AD). The first mention of the town (Oppidum in Latin, meaning citadel) is 1040, during the Byzantine Era.

The town is famous for its prolonged resistance before falling to Roger the Norman in 1056.

On February 5, 1783, an earthquake completely destroyed the town killing 1,198 people. The town was rebuilt near the neighbouring village Tresilico (incorporated in the municipality in 1927). Other earthquakes hit the town in 1894 and on December 28, 1908, which destroyed the neighbouring township  Castellace.

Economy
The economy is based on agriculture, in particular olive groves and the production of olive oil, as well citrus orchards in the plain. Forestry and sheep husbandry are also sources of income.

Crime
The town is home to the 'Ndrangheta, a Mafia-type criminal organization based in Calabria. Several powerful criminal clans originate from the town, such as the Mammoliti-Rugolo.

The town achieved a sad notoriety in July 2014 when, two weeks after Pope Francis, visiting Calabria, had publicly excommunicated the Mafia, a procession carrying a statue of the Madonna stopped to pay homage outside the house of a home confined local mafia leader.

Demographic evolution 

The population halved during the last century. Many inhabitants moved to the industrial centres in northern Italy or joined the Italian diaspora to escape the extreme poverty.

Notable people
 Salvatore Albano (1841-1893), sculptor
 Saverio Mammoliti (born 1942), 'Ndrangheta boss
 Candido Zerbi (1827–1889), politician and senator
 Alessio Viola

References

Cities and towns in Calabria